KRMX (92.9 FM) is a radio station broadcasting a country music format. KRMX is licensed to Marlin, Texas, United States, and serves the Waco/Temple market. The station is owned by M&M Broadcasters, Ltd.  Its studios are in Waco, and its transmitter is located south of Hewitt, Texas.

History
The station was assigned the call sign KLMT when it went on the air. On September 18, 1987, the station changed its call sign to KRXX, on March 12, 1990, to KEYR, on August 30, 1999, to KLRK, and then on July 15, 2010, to the current KRMX.

References

External links

RMX
Country radio stations in the United States